Miss Universe Spain 2015 was the third edition of the Miss Universe Spain pageant. It was held in the Auditorio de Marbella in Marbella on July 30 with 15 finalists competing.

At the end of the event, Carla García, a former Miss Spain 2010 runner-up and Miss World 2011 semi-finalist, won the crown and the rights to represent Spain at Miss Universe 2015. Carla was crowned by the outgoing winner Desirée Cordero Ferrer. In second place was Raquel Bonilla, who later represented Spain at Miss Supranational 2015. Placing third was Sofía del Prado, who went on to be crowned Reina Hispanoamericana 2015 and also later won the Miss Universe Spain 2017.

Results

Special awards 
 Miss Photogenic - Zaida Naranjo
 Miss Congeniality (voted by the contestants) - Laura Gonce
 Miss Kadus: Sofia del Prado
 Miss Public Vote on Instagram: Zayra Naranjo
 Best Hair: Sofia del Prado

Delegates

References 

Miss Spain
2015 in Spain
Universe Spain